

Richard Eugene Nisbett (born June 1, 1941) is an American social psychologist and writer. He is the Theodore M. Newcomb Distinguished Professor of social psychology and co-director of the Culture and Cognition program at the University of Michigan at Ann Arbor. Nisbett's research interests are in social cognition, culture, social class, and aging. He received his Ph.D. from Columbia University, where his advisor was Stanley Schachter, whose other students at that time included Lee Ross and Judith Rodin.

Perhaps his most influential publication is "Telling more than we can know: Verbal reports on mental processes" (with T. D. Wilson, 1977, Psychological Review, 84, 231–259), one of the most often cited psychology articles published, with over 13,000 citations. This article was the first comprehensive, empirically based argument that a variety of mental processes responsible for preferences, choices, and emotions are inaccessible to conscious awareness. Nisbett and Wilson contended that introspective reports can provide only an account of "what people think about how they think," but not "how they really think." Some cognitive psychologists disputed this claim, with Ericsson and Simon (1980) offering an alternative perspective.

Nisbett's  book  The Geography of Thought: How Asians and Westerners Think Differently... And Why (Free Press; 2003) contends that "human cognition is not everywhere the same," that Asians and Westerners "have maintained very different systems of thought for thousands of years," and that these differences are scientifically measurable.
Nisbett's book Intelligence and How to Get It: Why Schools and Cultures Count (2009) argues that environmental factors dominate genetic factors in determining intelligence. The book received extensive favorable attention in the press and from some fellow academics; for example, University of Pennsylvania psychologist Daniel Osherson wrote that the book was a "hugely important analysis of the determinants of IQ".  On the other hand, more critical reviewers such as Harvard's James J. Lee argued that the book failed to grapple with the strongest evidence for genetic factors in individual and group intelligence differences.

With Edward E. Jones, he named the actor–observer bias, the phenomenon where people acting and people observing use different explanations for why a behavior occurs.  This is an important concept in attribution theory, and refers to the tendency to attribute one's own behaviour to situational factors while attributing other people's behaviour to their disposition. Jones and Nisbett's own explanation for this was that our attention is focused on the situation when we are actors, but on the person when we are observers, although other explanations have been advanced for the actor-observer bias.

In popular culture
In an interview with The New York Times, Malcolm Gladwell said, "The most influential thinker, in my life, has been the psychologist Richard Nisbett. He basically gave me my view of the world."

Books and significant papers
 Nisbett, R. and T. Wilson (1977). "Telling more than we can know: Verbal reports on mental processes." Psychological Review 84(3): 231–259.
 Ross, L and Nisbett, R.E. The Person and the Situation. McGraw Hill, 1991. Reissued with new foreword by Malcolm Gladwell and afterword by the authors, 2011.
 Culture of Honor: The Psychology of Violence in the South (Westview Press, 1996)
 The Geography of Thought (Free Press, 2003)
 Intelligence and How to Get It: Why Schools and Cultures Count (Norton, 2009)
 Mindware: Tools for Smart Thinking (FSG, 2015)

Awards
 Donald T. Campbell Award for Distinguished Research in Social Psychology, awarded by the Society for Personality and Social Psychology, 1982.
 Award for Distinguished Scientific Contributions to Psychology, American Psychological Association, 1991.
 Fellow, American Academy of Arts and Sciences, 1992.
 Distinguished Senior Scientist Award, Society for Experimental Social Psychology, 1995
 Wei Lun Visiting Professor of Psychology, Chinese University of Hong Kong, 1995.
 William James Fellow Award for Distinguished Scientific Achievements, American Psychological Society, 1996.
 Elected to the National Academy of Sciences, 2002
 Oswald-Külpe-Award of the University of Würzburg, Germany, 2007

Notes

External links
 Nisbett's Home Page
 Nisbett's Faculty Profile
 The Edge Annual Question — 2006
 
 Biography in Contemporary Authors (2009)

1941 births
20th-century American psychologists
American psychology writers
21st-century American psychologists
Fellows of the American Academy of Arts and Sciences
Living people
Members of the United States National Academy of Sciences
People from Littlefield, Texas
Race and intelligence controversy
Social psychologists
Teachers College, Columbia University alumni
University of Michigan faculty
Writers from Texas